Naval Base Hollandia was a United States Navy base built during World War II at Humboldt Bay, near the city of Hollandia (now Jayapura) in New Guinea. The base was built by the US Navy Seabees during the Battle of Hollandia, starting on  May 9, 1944. Later Naval Base Hollandia became a supply base to support the invasion of the Philippines that started on October 20, 1944. Naval Base Hollandia became an advance headquarter of the United States Seventh Fleet.

History
The Battle of Hollandia started on April 22, 1944, as part of the New Guinea campaign.  United States Armed Forces as part of Operation Persecution landed at both Humboldt Bay and Tanahmerah Bay, 12 miles west of Humboldt Bay. Both bays are in a rain Tropical rainforest climate. On May 9, the Seabee 113th Construction Battalion arrived at Humboldt Bay and start construction on the port and docking facilities. Buildings and roads were built at the port base camp. A power station, water purification, Seabee camp and depot were built. To receive all the needed supplies for the new Naval Base a pier for Merchant Navy ships was built and completed on June 9. To prepare for the staging of troops, a second pier was built, starting September 13 and completed on November 23. A destroyer repair base was completed on September 1. Seabee 102rd Construction Battalion arrived at Humboldt Bay on June 12, 1944, to speed up construction projects. To expand the base a major land fill project was done into the bay. Beach landing ramps were built to support the loading and unloading of LST ships. Before the piers were completed the Seabee installed pontoon barge docks. Seabees were sent 25 miles west to Tanahmerah Bay on June 19. At Tanahmerah Bay a large fuel oil and diesel tank farm was built. From Tanahmerah Bay some Seabees were sent 8 miles inland to Lake Sentani and built an advance naval headquarters.  Seabee 119th and 122nd Construction Battalion arrived to help with work at Tanahmerah Bay. The 122nd Battalion worked at facilities the Wakde Airfield on an Island west of Humboldt Bay and at Aitape east of Humboldt Bay. Naval Base Hollandia supplied most of the supplies for the invasion of the Philippines. Some of the base was moved to more forward bases by the Naval Construction Maintenance Unit 558. The Naval Base Hollandia was closed in December 1945 and the facilities were sold to the Netherlands East Indies Government. .

Bases and facilities
Harbor administration 
Power station
Water purification plant
Seabee Camp
Seabee Depot
Supply Depot
Fleet post office FPO# 3115 SF Hollandia
PT Boat Base, (serviced by USS Oyster Bay (AGP-6))
Altape PT Boat Base
Repair Depot
Communication center
G-2 Navl hospital 500-beds
Destroyer repair base with 350 troops
Staging camp
Machine shops
Engineering camp
Chemical Engineering Camp
Degaussing range
Refrigerator storage
Crash boat base
Barracks
Mess Halls
Pontoon assembly depot
Ammunition depot
Hollandia Airfield near Lake Sentan 
Cyclops Airfield, inland from Hollandia 
Leimok Hill radio station
Tanahmerah Bay tank farm
Lake Sentani Base
Wakde Airfield, remote base
Aitape barracks and Mess hall, PT Boat Base, including PT-370,PT-114, PT-144 and PT-368 (serviced by USS Oyster Bay), remote base
Cape Soeadja Camp
Outlying Bases:

Naval Base Hollandia supports nearby small Outlying Bases
Naval Base Aitape at Aitape, Fleet PO Box was 927
Naval Base Aitape at Wewak,  Fleet PO Box was 3074 
Naval Base Saidor at Saidor, Fleet PO Box was 3086 
Naval Base Saidor Sungum at Saidor, Fleet PO Box was 3088

Gallery

See also

 US Naval Advance Bases
Naval Base Port Moresby
Naval Base Milne Bay
Naval Base Mios Woendi
Naval Base Lae
Naval Base Alexishafen

References

External links
youtube, Battle for New Guinea 1942-1945 
 youtube, Attack On Hollandia (1944)
youtube, Allied forces capture Hollandia in New Guinea 
youtube, Invasion of Hollandia

Naval Stations of the United States Navy
World War II airfields in the Pacific Ocean Theater
Airfields of the United States Navy
Military installations closed in the 1940s
Closed installations of the United States Navy